Croatian Chileans (Chileno-croatas, ; Croatian: čileanski Hrvati) are Chileans of full or partial Croatian descent. Chile has one of the largest communities of ethnic Croats outside Europe, second only to Croatian Americans. They are one of the main examples of successful assimilation of a non-Spanish-speaking European ethnic group into Chilean society. Many successful entrepreneurs, scientists and artists, as well as prominent politicians who have held some of the highest offices in the country, have been of Croatian descent – including the current president of the Republic, Gabriel Boric.

History 

The oppression of the Croatian people and the denial of an internationally recognised nation was the principal factor leading them to embark on a constant migration to Chile. At first they were recognised and officially registered as former citizens of the countries or empires from which they had fled. Until 1915 they were recognised as Austrians, and afterwards up until 1990 as Yugoslavians. Since 1990, and in accordance to the establishment of the newly internationally recognised Republic of Croatia, Chilean Croats have reasserted their cultural and ethnic identity.

The Croatian community first established itself in two provinces situated at the extreme ends of Chile: Antofagasta, in the Atacama desert of the north and Punta Arenas in the Patagonian region in the south. The large arrival of Croats in Chile began in 1864 and the migration grew steadily until 1956 – reaching a number of more than 6,000. In the early part of this 1864–1956 era more Croats settled in Argentina than in Chile. For example, in Argentina the number reached 80,000, but only about 57% of Croats remained in Argentina. Some returned to Europe or moved and settled in Chile where Croats had a more rapid and successful assimilation, which led to a significant increase in the Chilean-Croat population in periods when there was no migration of Croats from Europe to the Americas. Included are Istro-Romanians, who became adjusted to Chilean society because of the linguistic similarities between Istro-Romanian and Spanish, as well as Latin identity of Istro-Romanians.

It is estimated that there are up to 100,000–140,000 Chileans of Croatian descent. Even though the number may be much higher with some demographic analysts estimating a figure of 200,000.

Dalmatian-Croatian in Chile 
The first issue of the publication Sloboda was published in March 1902, in Antofagasta. It was the first newspaper of the Croatian immigrants in Latin America. The Croatian immigrants in Chile conducted extensive journalistic work since 1902, which includes more than 50 newspapers, publications and newsletters.

The Dalmatian coast, with thousands of islands of white rock, covered with vineyards, pine forests and olive trees, is similar to the geographical features of Chile. Most families have a relative or descendant in Chile. Chile's name, unlike other parts of the world where it is almost unknown, is loved and admired by many Dalmatians as a second home.

Croatians in Punta Arenas 

Punta Arenas is the most prominent settlement on the Strait of Magellan and the capital of the Magallanes y la Antártica Chilena Region, Chile. It has a population of over 146,000 inhabitants (2008). The city has its roots among the population origin of the European colonists (Croatian and Spanish) that populated the area in the mid-nineteenth century. There are also descendants of people from other countries (i.e. German, English, Italian, Swiss and others).

Croatian immigration in Punta Arenas was a crucial development in the region of Magallanes and the city in particular. Currently, it is possible to see this influence in the names of shops and many buildings.

Chilean Croats

Political figures 
Tamara Agnic - business administrator, Superintendent of pensions (2014-16)
Ingrid Antonijevic - economist, Chilean minister (2002-06)
Vicente Merino Bielich - Naval officer, Chilean minister (1946), Vice President of Chile (1946) 
Gabriel Boric - deputy (2014-22), President of Chile (since 2022)
Hernán Büchi Buc - economist, Chilean Minister (1983-84 / 1985-89)
Romy Schmidt Crnosija - lawyer, Chilean minister (2006-10)
Igor Garafulic - economist, Intendant of Santiago Metropolitan Region (2008-10)
Carolina Goić Borojević - social worker, deputy (2006-14), Senator (2014-22)
Alejandro Jadresic Marinovic - industrial engineer, Chilean minister (1994-98)
Carlos González Jaksic - teacher, Regidor (1963-69) and Alcalde of Punta Arenas (1964-67 / 1992-96), deputy (1969-1973)
Cedomil Lausic Glasinovic - agronomist, MIR activist
Yerko Ljubetic - lawyer, Chilean minister (2005-06)
Miodrag Marinović - businessman, deputy (2010-14)
Vlado Mirosevic - political scientist, deputy (since 2014)
Baldo Prokurica - lawyer, deputy (1990-2002), Senator (2002-18), Chilean minister (2018-20 / 2020-22)
Claudio Radonich - lawyer, Intendant of Magallanes Region (2013-14), Alcalde of Punta Arenas (since 2016)
Esteban Tomic - lawyer, Ambassador to the OAS (2000-06) 
Radomiro Tomic - lawyer, deputy (1941-49), Senator (1950-53 / 1961-65), Ambassador to the United States (1965-68)
Tomás Vodanovic - sociologist, Alcalde of Maipú (since 2021) 
Pedro Vuskovic - economist, Chilean minister (1970-72)
Edmundo Pérez Zujovic - businessman, Chilean minister (1965-67 / 1968-69)

Academics and scientists 
Francisco Bozinovic Kuscevic - biologist, National Prize for Natural Sciences (2020)
Lily Garafulic Yankovic - sculptor, professor of fine arts
 - literary critic and professor of literature at Pontifical Catholic University of Chile
Eric Goles - mathematician and author, National Prize for Exact Sciences (1993)
Alfredo Jadresic - professor of medicine (also Olympic high jumper)
Ernesto Livacic Gazzano - academic, author
 - academic, economist
Mateo Martinić Beroš - academic, Chilean National History Award (2000), founder of Institute of Patagonia
Luis Advis Vitaglich - philosophy academic, composer of Santa María de Iquique
 - academic, electrical engineer

Writers 
Lenka Franulic - journalist, author, the annual Lenka Fraunlic Award for the best journalist of the year was named in her honour
Astrid Fugellie Gezan - poet
José Goles Radnić - music writer and composer
Eugenio Mimica Barassi - author
Andrés Morales Milohnic - poet, author, academic, Prize Pablo Neruda 2001
Cristián Contreras Radovic - journalist, author, speaker, Doctor of Philosophy, leader of the United Centre
Roque Esteban Scarpa - poet, author, academic
Antonio Skármeta Vranicic - author, novelist

Sportspeople

Auto racing
Boris Garafulic Litvak - racing driver
Boris Garafulic Stipicic - racing driver

Basketball
Andrés Mitrovic - basketball player
Juan Ostoic - basketball player
Milenko Skoknic - basketball player, also diplomat

Football
Ivo Basay Hatibovic - football manager and footballer
Marko Biskupovic - footballer
Yerko Darlić - footballer
Felipe Seymour Dobud - footballer
Peter Dragicevic - football administrator, former president of Colo-Colo
Juan Koscina - footballer 
Benjamín Kuscevic - footballer
Vladimiro Mimica - sports radio personality, also Alcalde of Punta Arenas (2008-2012)
Milovan Mirošević - football manager and footballer
Nicolás Peranic - footballer 
Nicolás Peric - footballer and sports commentator
Harold Mayne-Nicholls Sekul - football administrator, former president of ANFP and FIFA official 
Jaime Lo Presti Travanic - footballer
Luka Tudor Bakulic - footballer and sports commentator

Other sports
Neven Ilic - sports official, member of the International Olympic Committee
Iván Morovic - Chess International Grandmaster
Juan Papic - table tennis player
Johnnathan Tafra - canoeist

Media personalities 
Cristián Arriagada Bižaca - actor
Jéssica Eterovic - model
Carolina Fadic – actress
Alejandro Goic - actor
Carolina Mestrovic - singer, model
Julio Milostich - actor
Paulina Mladinic - model
Isidora Cabezón Papic - actress
Martín Cárcamo Papic - television presenter
Pedro Pavlovic - journalist
Santiago Pavlovic - journalist
Mauricio Pesutic - actor
Simón Pesutic - actor
Ángela Contreras Radovic - actress
Manuela Martelli Salamovich - actress
Tonka Tomicic Petric - television presenter, model
Antonio Vodanovic - television presenter
Sergio Vodanović - screenwriter, journalist, dramatist, lawyer
Carolina Arregui Vuskovic - actress

Business people 
Pascual Baburizza Šoletić
Andrónico Luksic Abaroa
Andrónico Luksic Craig
Guillermo Luksic Craig
Jean-Paul Luksic Fontbona

Other notable Chilean croats 
Alejandro Goic Karmelic - clergyman
Leonor Oyarzún Ivanovic - First Lady of Chile
Antonio Rendić Ivanović - doctor, a.k.a. "Ivo Serge" as poet
Koko Stambuk - Chilean musician

See also 

 Chile–Croatia relations
 Croatian Argentines
 Croatian Brazilian
 Croatian Peruvian

References

External links 
 Diaspora Croata

 

Croatian diaspora by country
 
European Chilean